Fantasy Patrol is a Russian computer-animated fantasy web television series created by Vadim Volya and Evgeniy Golovin. The series follows the adventures of four young sorceress girls who live in the city of Myshkin. The series is produced by Studio Parovoz. It premiered on the multi-series newsreel, Moolt in Cinema on April 30, 2016, and was later released to YouTube on May 19, 2016.

A spin-off series, Fantasy Patrol: The Chronicles premiered on August 2, 2019. An animated film based on the series, Koshchey: The True Story is in production, planned to be released in theaters.

Plot
The series takes place in the mysterious city of Myshkin (Fableton in the English version), which is filled with many fairytale heroes and unusual adventures and miracles. The ordinary residents of the city are unsuspecting of the true nature of the city. Three young girls who also appear to be ordinary but are actually young sorceresses; Varya, Masha, and Snowy, move to Myshkin where they meet Helena, a local city girl. They soon become best friends with each other, forming a superhero team called the Fantasy Patrol. Their task is to observe the behavior of any fairytale characters that inhabit the city and help them, while protecting the calm side of the city from any harm, maintaining a balance between both worlds.

Cast

Main
 Miroslava Karpovich, Anfisa Wistingausen as Helena
 Olga Kuzmina as Varya
 Yuliya Aleksandrova as Masha
 Polina Kutepova as Snowy

Recurring
 Glafira Tarkhanova as Alice
 Alex Louis

Episodes

Broadcast
Fantasy Patrol has been broadcast in Russia on Moolt and Ani since May 2016, on Carousel by the end of 2016, and later on Super in 2018. In South Africa, the series premiered on eToonz on March 25, 2019. The first season is available in English on iTunes. 17 episodes of the show in English have been uploaded so far onto the Moolt Kids YouTube channel.Fantasy Patrol also released in Urdu in Pakistani Channel Kids zone Pakistan YouTube channel.

Songs
The music for the series was written by Russian band, Slot.

Accolades

Merchandise

Books
Russian writer and screenwriter, Oleg Roy set to work on a series of books based on Fantasy Patrol. In total, 12 books are planned to be published for the series. So far, 6 books have been released.

Games
Four apps were released for the series; "Fantasy Patrol", "Fantasy Patrol: Adventures", "Music Patrol", and "Fantasy Patrol: Cafe". All of these games were released on Android and iOS platforms.

Magazines
In November 2018, Fantasy Patrol magazines were released. Posters, stickers, and stories from Oleg Roy also come with the magazines.

Spin-off

A spin-off series of Fantasy Patrol was previewed on the main stage of Mooltimir on June 1, 2019 titled "Fantasy Patrol: The Chronicles". The series premiered on Moolt on August 2, 2019, and the first episode was then released to YouTube on August 27.

Film
In August 2017, the director of Parovoz, Anton Smetankin, announced the production of an animated film, Koschey: The Everlasting Story, based on the Fantasy Patrol series, which is originally scheduled to release in 2020, but it was delayed to 2021 due to the COVID-19 pandemic. The script will be written by Evgeny Golovin and Maria Parfenova. The film will tell the story of young Koschey and how he tries to find his way.

References

External links

 Fantasy Patrol on Parovoz

2010s Russian television series
2020s Russian television series
2016 Russian television series debuts
Computer-animated television series
Russian children's television series
Russian-language television shows